Mohammed Abdalas (born 26 October 1986) is a retired Danish-Moroccan professional footballer who played as a midfielder. He is currently the manager of Fremad Amager U19.

He made one appearance for FC Nordsjælland in the Danish Superliga. It came on 9 May 2009 in a 3–1 defeat at F.C. Copenhagen.

References

External links
Career statistics at Danmarks Radio

1986 births
Living people
Danish men's footballers
FC Nordsjælland players
Danish Superliga players
Danish 1st Division players
Association football midfielders
Danish people of Moroccan descent
Fremad Amager players